Amy Siu-haan Cheung (born November 3, 1967) is one of Hong Kong's most popular writers, well known throughout the Chinese-speaking world for her books on love and relationships.  Her first novel, Women on the Breadfruit Tree, appeared in serialized form in the daily newspaper Ming Pao.  She has written more than forty widely acclaimed books, including novels and essay collections. She was named one of the ten richest Chinese authors in 2013, as well as one of the ten most influential microbloggers on Weibo, with more than 64 million followers.

Biography 
Cheung was born in Hong Kong. She attended Hong Kong Baptist College, during which time she worked part-time as a scenarist and on the administrative staff of a TV station.

Her first novel, Women on the Breadfruit Tree, was published in 1995, and as of 2014, Cheung has written more than 40 novels, most of which are in the romance genre. Her works have appeared in numerous newspapers and magazines over the past two decades, particularly in the Hong Kong newspaper Apple Daily. Cheung also founded the magazine Amy in 1998.

Works

Cheung's books are described as romance or chick lit, though their endings are often bittersweet or tragic. Many of her books depict relationships strained by social conventions or taboos that are characteristic of Chinese culture.

In Hummingbirds Fly Backwards, a young woman who is the manager of a lingerie shop has an affair with a married man who will not leave his wife due to the stigma of divorce. The book is popular for its portrayal of the pressures felt by unmarried women in their late twenties or older, known as xing nu ("blooming women") in Hong Kong but socially stigmatized and referred to as sheng nu ("leftover women") in mainland China, where marriage rates are as high as over 90 percent for women aged 35. The original Cantonese title (Three A-Cup Women) is a tongue-in-cheek play on the term "A-quality women." A Chinglish pun that can be understood by locals in the former British Hong Kong, "A-Cup" refers to the characters' bra cup sizes and sounds identical to "A級" (Jyutping: kap1), or "A-quality," a term used to describe desirable women who are considered "the total package."

In For Love or Money, a mother from a well-to-do family hatches a plot to manipulate her son into abandoning his dreams of becoming an artist and joining the family business. In 2014, the novel was made into the film For Love or Money, starring Liu Yifei, Rain, and Joan Chen.

Publications
Novels
  Hummingbirds Fly Backwards (English translation, 2016; original title: 《三個A CUP的女人》, 1995; 《我這輩子有過你》 )
 Never, Ever Say Goodbye (original title:《永不永不說再見》)
 Women on the Breadfruit Tree (original title:《麵包樹上的女人》)
 For Love or Money (original title: 《紅顏露水》)

Essays
 Thank You for Leaving Me (original title:《謝謝你離開我》)
 "The Distance between Friends" 
 "Be Afraid to Believe" 
 "Don't Believe Prince" 
 "The Hidden Love"

References

External links 
 Amy Cheung's microblog (in Chinese) Sina Visitor System

Living people
Hong Kong novelists
Alumni of Hong Kong Baptist University
1967 births
21st-century novelists
21st-century women writers
20th-century novelists
20th-century women writers
Hong Kong women writers